Daniel Lionel Hanington (June 27, 1835 – May 5, 1909) was a New Brunswick, Canada politician and jurist.

He was born at Shediac, New Brunswick, the son of Daniel Hanington, and was educated there and at Mount Allison Academy in Sackville. He went on to study law and was called to the New Brunswick bar in 1861. In that same year, he married Emily Myers Wetmore. He served as a school trustee for several years and was clerk for the Westmorland County court from 1867 to 1870.

Hanington ran unsuccessfully for a seat in the provincial legislature for Westmorland in 1870 but was elected in an 1870 by-election as a Liberal-Conservative. He was defeated in 1874 then regained his seat in 1878 and entered the cabinet of Premier John James Fraser as minister without portfolio and succeeded Fraser as premier in 1882. Hanington was sympathetic to Acadian rights and appointed a member of that community, Pierre-Amand Landry, to the senior cabinet position of provincial secretary. However, Hanington faced a leader of the opposition, Andrew G. Blair who had organised the Liberal Party into a powerful force. In 1883, Blair defeated Hanington's Conservative government in a Motion of No Confidence and won the subsequent election. Hanington continued as leader of the opposition but was unable to defeat Blair's Liberals in the 1886 election. He remained in the legislature until 1892 and, in 1896, he accepted an appointment to the bench as a member of the province's Supreme Court.

He was the presiding judge at the last trial of Tom Collins.

References 
The Canadian biographical dictionary and portrait gallery of eminent and self-made men ... (1881), pp. 660–661. 
Biography, Government of New Brunswick (pdf)

1835 births
1909 deaths
Lawyers in New Brunswick
Judges in New Brunswick
Premiers of New Brunswick
Canadian Anglicans
People from Shediac